Instituto de Administração de Projetos Educacionais Futebol Clube, commonly known as IAPE, is a Brazilian football club based in São Luís, Maranhão state. They competed in the Copa do Brasil once.

History
The club was founded on August 8, 2008. IAPE won the Campeonato Maranhense Second Level in 2008, and the Copa União do Maranhão in 2010. They are facing Atlético Mineiro in the 2011 edition of the Copa do Brasil.

Achievements

 Campeonato Maranhense Second Level:
 Winners (1): 2008
 Runner-up (1): 2020
 Copa União do Maranhão:
 Winners (1): 2010

Stadium

Instituto de Administração de Projetos Educacionais Futebol Clube play their home games at Estádio Nhozinho Santos. The stadium has a maximum capacity of 16,500 people.

References

Association football clubs established in 2008
Football clubs in Maranhão
2008 establishments in Brazil